The  Washington Redskins season was the franchise's 27th season in the National Football League.  The team failed to improve on their 5–6–1 record from 1957 and finished 4-7-1.

Schedule

Standings

Washington
Washington Redskins seasons
Washing